Josh Engel (born July 7, 1984) is an American former professional ice hockey defenseman.

Playing career
Engel primarily played for the Toronto Marlies in the American Hockey League (AHL). He played collegiate hockey with the University of Wisconsin culminating in a National Championship in the 2005–06 season.

Career statistics

References

External links

1984 births
Living people
Albany River Rats players
American men's ice hockey defensemen
Green Bay Gamblers players
Gwinnett Gladiators players
Ice hockey players from Wisconsin
Providence Bruins players
Reading Royals players
Toronto Marlies players
Wisconsin Badgers men's ice hockey players
People from Rice Lake, Wisconsin